"For He's a Jolly Good Fellow" is a popular song that is sung to congratulate a person on a significant event, such as a promotion, a birthday, a wedding (or playing a major part in a wedding), a retirement, a wedding anniversary, the birth of a child, or the winning of a championship sporting event. The melody originates from the French song "Malbrough s'en va-t-en guerre" ("Marlborough Has Left for the War").

History
The tune is of French origin and dates at least from the 18th century. Allegedly it was composed the night after the Battle of Malplaquet in 1709. It became a French folk tune and was popularised by Marie Antoinette after she heard one of her maids singing it. The melody became so popular in France that it was used to represent the French defeat in Beethoven's composition Wellington's Victory, Op. 91, written in 1813.

The melody also became widely popular in the United Kingdom. By the mid-19th century it was being sung with the words "For he's a jolly good fellow", often at all-male social gatherings, and "For she's a jolly good fellow", often at all-female social gatherings. By 1862, it was already familiar in America.

The British and the American versions of the lyrics differ. "And so say all of us" is typically British, while "which nobody can deny" is regarded as the American version, but "which nobody can deny" has been used by non-American writers, including Charles Dickens in Household Words, Hugh Stowell Brown in Lectures to the Men of Liverpool and James Joyce in Finnegans Wake. (In the short story "The Dead" from Dubliners, Joyce has a version that goes, "For they are jolly gay fellows..." with a refrain between verses of "Unless he tells a lie".)

Text
As with many songs that use gender-specific pronouns, the song can be altered to agree with the gender of the intended recipient. If the song is being sung to two or more people, it is altered to use plurals.

British version

American version

Melody

References

External links
 "For He's a Jolly Good Fellow", text and sound, National Institute of Environmental Health Sciences

1709 songs
1700s neologisms
English folk songs
English children's songs
Traditional children's songs
War of the Spanish Succession
Quotations from music